Zbąszynek is a town in western Poland, in Lubusz Voivodeship, in Świebodzin County. As of 2019, it has 5,020 inhabitants.

History
The town was founded in the early 1920s when, as a result of the Treaty of Versailles, the railroad hub in nearby Zbąszyń (Bentschen) became part of the Second Polish Republic. In 1922, the government of Weimar Germany decided to build a new border station, a new rail hub (which replaced Zbaszyn) as well as a settlement for railroad workers. Within a few years in 1923–30, a large station was constructed, together with a modern suburban type settlement, based on a project by architect Friedrich Veil. The town, named Neu Bentschen, was inhabited by ethnic German railroad workers. There were two churches, a printing shop, a house of culture (Deutsches Haus), a school, a mail office and a bank. The settlement belonged to the Meseritz county.

It was from German Neu-Bentschen (now Zbąszynek) that thousands of Polish Jews expelled from Germany in October, 1938, were forced into Polish Zbąszyń, among them the parents of Herschel Grynszpan.

World War II
Following the invasion of Poland in World War II, the Germans opened a forced-labour camp in Zbąszynek, in which various categories of prisoners were kept including POWs from France, Italy, and, after 1941, from the Soviet Union, as well as Jews from the Łódź Ghetto. Hundreds died of diseases and exhaustion. Those who survived, worked on the rail infrastructure, which was necessary for transports to the Eastern front.

In January 1945 some German inhabitants of Neu Bentschen fled the advancing Red Army and the town was captured without fighting. As a result of the territorial changes of Poland immediately after World War II following the Potsdam Conference, it was part of the German territory transferred to Poland. The remaining populace was expelled to Germany. Neu Bentschen was briefly called Nowy Zbąszyń, some time in the late 1940s, the name was changed to Zbąszynek.

Twin towns – sister cities
See twin towns of Gmina Zbąszynek.

Gallery

See also
German–Polish customs war

References

External links

Official town website,
Zbaszynek, train, and I

Cities and towns in Lubusz Voivodeship
Świebodzin County
Populated places established in 1923
Holocaust locations in Poland